Ohanaeze Ndigbo  is an Igbo socio-cultural organization in Nigeria. The group aims to represent the interests of all Igbo communities within and outside Nigeria.

Although the group is not a political party, one of its main objectives is to foster unity among its members in order to more effectively represent the political interests of Igbos in Nigeria.

History
The Igbo State Union, the precursor to the Ohanaeze Igbo, was founded in 1934 by Igbo elites and intellectuals to advance the interests of Igbos in what was then the Colony and Protectorate of Nigeria ruled by the British Empire. After the 1966 anti-Igbo pogrom and the Nigerian Civil War, hundreds of prominent Igbos convened to unify Igbos under a new umbrella organization, the Igbo National Assembly (INA).

This organization was later banned by the Nigerian military dictatorship, from fears that the existence of the organization would promote Igbo separatism. Thus, a successor pan-Igbo organization, the Ohanaeze Ndigbo, was formed in 1976 by Professor Ben Nwabueze, a constitutional lawyer.

The organization was supported by Kingsley Mbadiwe, Dr. Francis Akanu Ibiam, Dr. Michael Iheonukara Okpara, Dr. Pius Okigbo, and Chief Jerome Udorji (who served as the first Secretary General), among other notable Igbos.

Current National Executive Committee
Amb Prof. George Obiozor    — President General 
Dr Kingsley Lawrence  — Deputy President General
Elder Barr. Onuoha Udeka (rtd)2   — Vice President General  (Abia)
Chief Damian Okeke Ogene         —   Vice President General  (Anambra)
DR. Sylvanus O. Ebigwei, MON. —   Vice President General  (Delta)
Prof. Chigozie N. Ogbu, OFR       —   Vice president-General  (Ebonyi)
Hon. Igochukwu Okparanma          — Vice President—General  (Rivers)
Chief Okey Emuchay             —   Secretary-General
Dr. Solomon N. Ogunji             —   Deputy Secretary-General
Ojogu Joseph Obinama           — National Legal Adviser
Eze Beatrice                      —   National Treasurer
Chief Chief Alphonsus Duru        —  National Financial Secretary
Dr Alex Chiedozie Ogbonnia        —  National. Publicity Secretary
Chief Eric Ebeh                   —   Asst. Nat. Treasurer
Chief Barr. Okeagu Ogadah         — Assistant National Legal Adviser
Elder Chris Eluemunoh             —   Asst. Nat. Fin. Secretary
                                  —  Asst. National Pub. Secretary
Elder Justice R.C. Ajuzieogu      —    State President (Abia)
Chief Damian Okeke (Ogene)        —    State President (Anambra)
Chief Emeka Festus Ogwu         —    State President (Delta)
Comrade Boniface Offor            —    State President (Ebonyi)
Chief Alex Chiedozie Ogbonnia     —  State President (Enugu)
Dr. Ezechi Chukwu                 —    State President (Imo)
Igo Okparanma (VPG Rivers)        —    Ag. State President
Eugene Ibeabuchi                  —    Admin. Secretary

See also 
 Chief John Nnia Nwodo
 Oodua Peoples Congress
 Gani Adams
 List of civil societies in Nigeria

References

External links

Igbo society
Organizations established in 1976
1976 establishments in Nigeria
Cultural organizations based in Nigeria